The Avro 642 Eighteen was a 1930s British monoplane airliner. Only two were built — one twin-engined and the other four-engined.

Development
As a follow-on to the Avro 618 Ten the Eighteen was a larger aircraft but used a modified Avro Ten wing. The wing was moved to the shoulder position with the engines mounted on the wing and a new larger fuselage was used. When the design was completed in February 1933 it was the largest aircraft designed by Avro. The new fuselage was a fabric-covered welded steel structure with seats for 16 passengers, a baggage area and a toilet. The nose section was made of wood and originally had a semi-circular glazed front, although this was later changed to a more conventional-type windscreen. The wooden wing was designed to use any of the engines in the Armstrong-Siddeley family and the first aircraft was built with two Armstrong Siddeley Jaguar VID engines with four-bladed propellers.

With an order from the Midland and Scottish Air Ferries the first aircraft was nearly complete by December 1933. Registered G-ACFV the aircraft performed official performance trials at Martlesham Heath and was then returned to Woodford Aerodrome when the nose was modified. On 6 April 1934, G-ACFV was handed over to the customer and was then flown to Castle Bromwich to pick up Prime Minister Ramsay MacDonald and the Secretary of State for Air Lord Londonderry. With these important passengers on board, G-ACFV was flown to Speke Aerodrome so that they could declare open a new air service between Glasgow, London and Belfast. At the same time Lord Londonderry named the aircraft The Marchioness of Londonderry. Following the ceremony the Prime Minister and party were flown to Heston Aerodrome in London.

The second aircraft was ordered by the Viceroy of India, Lord Willingdon and was completed in November 1934 with four Armstrong Siddeley Lynx IVC engines and long rectangular windows on each side.

Operational history
From 6 April 1934, the Eighteen was used with other aircraft on the Glasgow-London-Belfast service after being bought by Midland and Scottish Air Ferries. In May 1935 G-ACFV was sold to Brian Allen Aviation for use with a variety of associated companies including Commercial Air Hire of Croydon who used it for continental newspaper deliveries during 1935-1936, and Air Dispatch Ltd. CAH used the aircraft for excursions and joyriding duties while Air Dispatch operated a daily newspaper flight between London and Paris, and a passenger service on the weekend. Due to the increase in freight business, the aircraft was fitted with a larger loading door. She was destroyed in New Guinea on 21 January 1942 by Japanese military forces.
   
The four-engined second aircraft Registered VT-AFM was handed over on 12 December 1934 and named the Star of India. By arrangement with the Indian Government the aircraft was operated and maintained by Indian National Airways when not required by the Viceroy. The aircraft was taken over by the Royal Air Force as L9166 in 1937 for use by AHQ India and was dismantled at Delhi in 1940. It has been said that the performance of the four-engined plane was poor, even dangerous, due to the reduced wing area caused by the extra "power-eggs".

Variants
642/2m
Two 450 hp (336 kW) Armstrong Siddeley Jaguar VID engines mounted on the wings, one built.
642/4m
Four 215 hp (160 kW) Armstrong Siddeley Lynx engines, one built.

Operators

Mandated Airlines
 British India
Indian National Airways

Commercial Air Hire
Midland and Scottish Air Ferries
Royal Air Force

Specifications (641/2m)

See also

References

Bibliography

642 Eighteen
1930s British airliners
Four-engined tractor aircraft
Aircraft first flown in 1934
Four-engined piston aircraft